Wesley Church is a Uniting Church in the centre of Melbourne, in the State of Victoria, Australia.

Wesley Church was originally built as the central church of the Wesleyan movement in Victoria. It is named after John Wesley (1703–1791), the founder of Methodism. Today Wesley Church is the home of two Uniting Church congregations, the English-speaking Wesley Church, and the Chinese-speaking Gospel Hall.

In 1902, the Wesleyan Church in Australia combined with four other churches to form the Methodist Church of Australasia. In 1977, the Methodist, Presbyterian and Congregational Churches further combined to form the Uniting Church.

History

Wesleyans were part of the life of Melbourne from the beginning of European settlement. The first Christian worship service in Melbourne was led by Henry Reed, a businessman and Wesleyan lay preacher from Launceston, Tasmania. The first service by an ordained Christian minister in Melbourne was led by Joseph Orton, Wesleyan Superintendent of Tasmania, on 24 April 1836. Joseph Orton had been a strong opponent of slavery in Jamaica, where he was imprisoned for his views. In Tasmania, he was an equally strong critic of mistreatment of aboriginal people.

A small chapel was built in 1838, and then replaced with a larger one in Collins Street, able to seat 600 people, opened in June 1841. The organ imported for that church in 1842 is still in use in the present church.

The present Wesley Church, in Lonsdale Street was built in 1858. The Superintendent, Daniel Draper, strongly proposed a grand Gothic design with high quality architecture. This design was criticised by many Wesleyans as too ornate, too Gothic and too Anglican for a Wesleyan Church. However, Draper's design prevailed. The foundation stone was laid on 2 December 1857, and the Church was opened on 26 August 1858.

This Church was the central congregation of the Wesleyan Church for Victoria, where the Conferences met, and where ministers were ordained. It was located in a poor part of Melbourne, and pioneered many initiatives in Community Service. In the 1880s, a team of Biblewomen were appointed to work with people experiencing serious poverty. One of these was Mrs Varcoe, who established Livingstone House, a home for homeless boys in Drummond St, Carlton.

In 1869, Wesley Church appointed Moy Ling to begin a Chinese-speaking congregation in Little Bourke Street. He named it the "Gospel Hall".

In 1893, during the acute depression which followed the bank crash of 1891, Alexander Robert Edgar was appointed as minister, with an expectation that he would develop a city mission and be its first Superintendent. So Wesley became the base for the Central Methodist Mission, now called Wesley Mission Victoria, which grew into one of Melbourne's largest non-profit social welfare agencies. Its headquarters on this site adjoin the church. Edgar also began the "Pleasant Sunday Afternoon", where major speakers would speak about important public questions.

Irving Benson was Superintendent of the Mission for over 40 years, from 1926 to 1967. Under his leadership, the Pleasant Sunday Afternoon was broadcast on radio, widely across Victoria. The Central Methodist Mission took many new initiatives in that time, and he was knighted for his services to the community. However his conservative political views placed him increasingly at odds with the leadership of the Methodist Church.

His successor was Arthur Preston, Superintendent from 1968 to 1981. Under his leadership the Mission closed many of its institutions and replaced them by personal services. He was also a strong vocal opponent of the war in Vietnam.

In the 1970s, the Gospel Hall Chinese Church outgrew its building in Little Bourke St, and transferred its main service to Wesley Church.

Wesley Church became a Congregation of the Uniting Church in Australia in 1977, as did all Methodist Churches in Australia.

In 2000, both the Congregation and the Mission Board became polarised over proposals to establish a primary care health facility in the grounds, which would have included the option of supervised drug injection. As a result of this very public dispute, the Synod of Victoria separated the Mission from the Congregation in 2001. They now function as two separate bodies.

Since 2001, Wesley Congregation has become very cross-cultural, including members from many Asian cultures. This participation has been encouraged by the previous ministers, Jason Kioa and the late Rev Dr Douglas Miller. Wesley Church's website describes its worship and theological style as "orthodox biblical teaching, classical reformed worship, and a cross-cultural lifestyle".

Architecture
Wesley Church was designed by Joseph Reed, who also designed the Melbourne Town Hall, the Scots' Church and the Independent Church (now St. Michael’s) in Collins St. The church is in the English Gothic style and takes the shape of a cross.

The church is 50.3 metres long from north to south and 23.5 metres across at the transepts. It has an octagonal spire rising 53.3 meters above ground level.

Wesley's organ was the first pipe organ in Melbourne. It was built in England, and arrived in Melbourne in 1842, being moved to the present church in 1858. It was largely rebuilt in 1957.

Inside the church are two paintings by the noted Australian painter Rupert Bunny (1864–1947): "The Prodigal Son" (Luke 15:11-32) and "Abraham's Sacrifice" (Genesis 22:1-14), which Bunny gave to Wesley Church in 1934.

A statue of John Wesley stands in front of the church. It was sculpted by the British sculptor Paul Raphael Montford in 1935.

The grounds contain other buildings, including the former School House, 1852,  the old Parsonage, and Nicholas Hall, an art deco style hall which was a gift of the Nicholas family. Wesley House is the administrative centre of Wesley Mission. The Princess Mary Club, built to provide accommodation for young women starting study or a career in the city, was opened in 1926.

The grounds also contain an olive tree transplanted to the church grounds in 1875, but believed to be from a cutting brought to Melbourne from Jerusalem in 1839. This claim cannot be verified. If true, this tree could be the oldest imported tree in Victoria.

References

Bibliography

External links
Gospel Hall Website
Wesley Mission Victoria website

Churches completed in 1858
19th-century Protestant churches
1858 establishments in Australia
Uniting churches in Melbourne
Buildings and structures in Melbourne City Centre
Heritage-listed buildings in Melbourne